Tyler Sheehy (born November 20, 1995) is an American professional ice hockey center who currently plays for Nürnberg Ice Tigers in the Deutsche Eishockey Liga (DEL). He was an All-American for Minnesota.

Playing career
Sheehy joined the Golden Gophers ice hockey team in the fall of 2015 and immediately became a key contributor on offense. After helping Minnesota capture its 4th-consecutive first-place finish, Sheehy became one of the team's stars as a sophomore. Sheehy led the Gophers in scoring and was named an All-American. Unfortunately, Minnesota lost both of its postseason games that season and ended the season on a sour note. Entering his junior season, Sheehy was named team captain and, with the team ranked 3rd in the pre-season poll, there were high expectations. As it turned out, however, Minnesota's offense played poorly all season while Sheehy's offensive numbers were more than halved. The fallout from losing both playoff matches once more was the resignation of head coach Don Lucia after 19 seasons. Sheehy's production recovered in his senior season under new bench boss Bob Motzko but Minnesota fared little better in their record and Sheehy's college career ended with just a single NCAA tournament game to his résumé.

After graduating, Sheehy signed with the Minnesota Wild and was assigned to their AHL affiliate for the remainder of the season. He spent most of his first full year as a professional playing with the Allen Americans but made the most of his time there, leading the team in scoring. Unfortunately, due to the COVID-19 pandemic, he wasn't able to showcase his talent in any postseason games. He was resigned to a 1-year contract when the following season finally began and split time between the Americans and the Iowa Wild. He didn't have as good of a season the second time around but did finally return to postseason action.

In 2021, Sheehy travelled to Germany to continue his professional career and signed a deal with the Nürnberg Ice Tigers of the top flight DEL.

Career statistics

Awards and honors

References

External links

1995 births
Living people
AHCA Division I men's ice hockey All-Americans
Allen Americans players
American men's ice hockey centers
Iowa Wild players
Ice hockey people from Minnesota
People from Burnsville, Minnesota
Minnesota Golden Gophers men's ice hockey players
Nürnberg Ice Tigers players
Waterloo Black Hawks players
Youngstown Phantoms players